Eubaphe meridiana (the little beggar) is a moth in the family Geometridae. It was first described by Annie Trumbull Slosson in 1889. It is found in the eastern United States. The species is listed as endangered in the US state of Connecticut.

The wingspan is 18–25 mm. Adults resemble Eubaphe mendica, but have deeper orange forewings and smaller spots forming purplish-grey antemedian and postmedian bands.

References

Eudulini
Moths described in 1889
Moths of North America
Taxa named by Annie Trumbull Slosson